It Must Be Love is a 2004 American television film directed by Steven Schachter and starring Ted Danson and Mary Steenburgen.  It is based on the short story "Rediscovered Love" by Nancy Whitmore.

Cast
Ted Danson as George Gazelle
Mary Steenburgen as Clem Gazelle
Polly Holliday as Mama Bell
Bonnie Bartlett as Kate Gazelle
Erin Karpluk as Tess Gazelle
Adam Nicholas Frost as Joe Gazelle

Production
The film was shot in Calgary.

References

External links
 

2000s English-language films
2004 films
2004 television films
CBS network films
Films based on short fiction
Films directed by Steven Schachter
Films scored by Jeff Beal
Films shot in Calgary